Russell Crossley (25 June 1927 – 2 July 2018) was an English footballer who played as a goalkeeper for Liverpool in The Football League. Crossley came to Liverpool's attention while he was playing for the army and signed for the club in 1950. Crossley was never the regular first choice keeper while he was at Liverpool, he was in and out of the side during his time at the club. Out of the goalkeepers in the club's history Crossley has the worst average of conceding goals. During his time at the club he conceded 138 goals in 73 matches, which equates to 1.89 goals a game. Crossley died in July 2018 at the age of 91.

References

1927 births
2018 deaths
Association football goalkeepers
English Football League players
English footballers
Liverpool F.C. players
People from Hebden Bridge
Shrewsbury Town F.C. players